Chikankata District is a district of Southern Province, Zambia. It was separated from Mazabuka District in December 2011.

References 

 
Districts of Southern Province, Zambia